St. Francis Xavier Church is a parish of the Roman Catholic Church in the town of Salalah, Oman.

The parish is part of the Apostolic Vicariate of Southern Arabia, a territory of the Latin Rite in the United Arab Emirates, Oman and Yemen. It is one of four parishes in the Sultanate of Oman, the others being Sts. Peter and Paul, Ruwi, Muscat, Holy Spirit Church, Ghala, Muscat and St. Anthony of Padua Church, Sohar.

Fr. Augustine Antao SJ, the first parish priest, built St. Francis Xavier Church on land donated by Sultan Qaboos bin Said Al Said. The church was dedicated on 1 May 1984, followed three years later the parish hall. With the increase of the faithful, the parish hall was refurbished and became the main church. The Catechism Centre was built in 1998, and had a second storey added in 2012.

See also
 Catholic Church in Oman

References

Roman Catholic churches in Oman
Buildings and structures in Salalah
Roman Catholic churches completed in 1981
20th-century Roman Catholic church buildings
Apostolic Vicariate of Southern Arabia
Catholic Church in the Arabian Peninsula